Victor Janvier (1851–1911) was a French sculptor and engraver notable for inventing the Janvier Reducing Machine, a type of lathe which improved the die making process within mints.

References

19th-century French sculptors
19th-century French inventors
1851 births
1911 deaths